Prasophyllum atratum, commonly known as the Three Humock leek orchid, is a species of orchid endemic to Tasmania. It has a single tubular, dark green leaf and up to twenty five brownish- to purplish-green flowers with a dark purplish labellum. It is only known from a single population of fewer than one thousand plants growing on Three Hummock Island.

Description
There is a blackish callus in the centre of the labellum and extending nearly to its tip. Flowering occurs in October and November.

Taxonomy and naming
Prasophyllum atratum was first formally described in 2006 by David Jones from a specimen collected near the airstrip on Three Hummock Island. The description was published in Australian Orchid Research. The specific epithet (atratum) is a Latin word meaning "dressed in black", referring to the dark-coloured flowers.

Distribution and habitat
The Three Hummock leek orchid grows in sedgy heath on Three Hummock Island.

Conservation
Prasophyllum atratum is listed as "Critically Endangered" under the Commonwealth Government Environment Protection and Biodiversity Conservation Act 1999 (EPBC) Act and as "Endangered" (the highest risk category) under the Tasmanian Threatened Species Protection Act 1995. It is only known from a single population growing mainly on an airstrip and the area surrounding it. The orchid appears to benefit from disturbance.

References

atratum
Flora of Tasmania
Endemic orchids of Australia
Plants described in 2006